The 1991 UC Santa Barbara Gauchos football team represented the University of California, Santa Barbara (UCSB) as an independent during the 1991 NCAA Division II football season. Led by Rick Candaele in his second and final season as head coach, the Gauchos compiled a record of 5–3 and were outscored by their opponents 218 to 217 for the season. The team played home games at Harder Stadium in Santa Barbara, California.

In 1992, the National Collegiate Athletic Association (NCAA) legislated that NCAA Division I colleges must play at that level in all sports. As UC Santa Barbara played at the Division I level in basketball and other sports, that would have required a significant upgrade to the football program. A new student fee to finance the football program was proposed to the students, but it was defeated. UC Santa Barbara was forced to drop the football program again. It had previously been discontinued after the 1971 season. Candaele finished his two-year stint as head coach with a record of 11–7 for a .611 winning percentage.

Schedule

Notes

References

UC Santa Barbara
UC Santa Barbara Gauchos football seasons
UC Santa Barbara Gauchos football